Psammogobius is a genus of fish in the family Gobiidae found in the Atlantic, Indian and Pacific Ocean.

Species
There are currently 4 recognized species in this genus:

 Psammogobius biocellatus (Valenciennes, 1837) (Sleepy sandgoby)
 Psammogobius knysnaensis J. L. B. Smith, 1935 (Knysna sandgoby)
 Psammogobius pisinnus Allen, 2017 (Sandslope goby)
 Psammogobius viet Prokofiev, 2016

References

 
Gobiidae
Marine fish genera
Taxa named by J. L. B. Smith